Chatsquot Mountain, 2365 m (7759 feet), is a high-prominence summit in the Kitimat Ranges of the Coast Mountains in British Columbia, Canada, located northwest of Kimsquit Lake, east of the lower Kitlope River, and at the upper end of the basin of the Kimsquit River. It is part of the Kitimat Ranges which in turn form part of the Coast Mountains. It is also one of the most isolated mountain peaks of Canada.

See also
 List of Ultras of North America
 Chatscah Indian Reserve No. 2

References

Further reading

External links
 

Kitimat Ranges
Two-thousanders of British Columbia
Range 4 Coast Land District